The following is a list of notable European windstorms.

Windstorms

Before 1800

1800–1899

1900–1974

1975–1999

2000–2009

2010–2018

Since 2019

See also 

 European windstorm
 Extratropical cyclone
 Tropical cyclone effects in Europe

References

External links 
Free University Berlin Adopt a Vortex
Met Office, University of Exeter & University of Reading: Extreme Wind Storms Catalogue
Météo-France: Notable storms in France 
Graph of notable storms in France since 1980
Météo-France Historic Storms (in French)
KNMI list of severe storms
List of extreme weather events named by the Norwegian Meteorological Institute 
Stormar i Sverige (Storms in Sweden) 
DMI; Storms in Denmark Since 1891 (continuously updated)

Extratropical cyclones
Weather hazards
 
Windstorms